ATP-dependent DNA helicase Q5 is an enzyme that in humans is encoded by the RECQL5 gene.

Interactions 

RECQL5 has been shown to interact with EEF1G.

References

Further reading